Moondrezhuthil En Moochirukkum is a 1991 Indian Tamil-language romantic drama film directed by Manobala. The film stars Vijayakanth and Rupini, with newcomers Srinivas Varma and Geetha Vijayan, Anandaraj, Thilakan, Mansoor Ali Khan, Jayabharathi and Sathyapriya playing supporting roles. It was released on 5 November 1991.

Plot

Robert (Vijayakanth) was an orphan child living on the street. He was adopted by a poor couple who had one child and grew up working on his adoptive father's carpentry workshop. Many years later, Robert becomes a carpenter who makes coffins in Nagercoil and works hard to support his family. His adoptive father had died, his brother Peter (Srinivas Varma) studies in Chennai while Robert lives with his adoptive mother Mary (Jayabharathi). After passing the higher secondary examination, Peter returns home to his family.

In Nagercoil, Peter meets his childhood friend Stella (Geetha Vijayan) who is also studying in Chennai. They slowly fall in love with each other. Stella has a brother Amirtharajah (Anandaraj) who is a wicked man and he cannot hesitate to kill his enemies. Amirtharajah is also an influential figure and he is the wealthiest man in Nagercoil. When Amirtharajah realises that his sister is in love with a boy from an underprivileged background, Amirtharajah and his henchmen beat up Peter. Robert supports their love and challenges Amirtharajah that he would arrange their marriage at any cost. Amirtharajah then forces every wood supplier to stop selling to Robert's shop. This means that Robert can no longer make coffins but he continues to challenge Amirtharajah. Amirtharajah offers to pay in exchange for leaving his sister and Robert surprisingly accepts the deal. Peter is crazy with anger about his brother's decision and insults Robert badly but Robert stays calm. Robert wins an auction that featured wood and pays for it with Amirtharajah's money. He then sends the wood to Amirtharajah's home to teach Amirtharajah a lesson. After the auction, Robert tells his brother that he was in love with a woman in the past.

Robert was in love with Parvathy Namboodiri (Rupini). Her father, Namboodiri (Thilakan), refused to allow the marriage because of Robert's religion and social status, eventually killing Parvathy when Robert persisted. Robert promises to his brother that he would give his life to arrange his marriage with Stella. What transpires next forms the rest of the story.

Cast

Vijayakanth as Robert
Rupini as Parvathy Namboodiri
Srinivas Varma as Peter
Geetha Vijayan as Stella
Anandaraj as Amirtharajah
Thilakan as Namboodiri
Mansoor Ali Khan as Moses
Jayabharathi as Mary
Sathyapriya as Rosey
Vennira Aadai Moorthy as Doctor
T. K. S. Chandran
Usilaimani
Pasi Narayanan
Kullamani
J.K.
Master Vikram Babu as young Robert
Master Santhosh as young Peter
Baby Srilekha as young Stella
Ponnambalam

Soundtrack

The film score and the soundtrack were composed by Ilayagangai. The soundtrack, released in 1991, features seven tracks with lyrics written by Kalidasan.

Reception
The Indian Express wrote "Clichéd scriptline gets a new shape in this Vijayakanth starrer with an attempt to place characters in life like situations.".

References

1991 films
1990s Tamil-language films
Indian romantic drama films
1991 romantic drama films
Films directed by Manobala